This is a list of members of the Victorian Legislative Council from the elections of 3 September 1886 to the elections of 31 August 1888.

There were fourteen Provinces, each returning three members for a total of 42 members.

Note the "Term in Office" refers to that members term(s) in the Council, not necessarily for that Province.

James MacBain was President of the Council, Frank Dobson was Chairman of Committees.

 Beaver died 7 October 1887; replaced by George Le Fevre, sworn-in November 1887.
 Bromell died 9 October 1887; replaced by James Philip Macpherson, sworn-in November 1887
 Henty died September 1887; replaced by Charles James, sworn-in October 1887.

References

 Re-member (a database of all Victorian MPs since 1851). Parliament of Victoria.

Members of the Parliament of Victoria by term
19th-century Australian politicians